August Storck KG is a German candy producer with headquarters in Berlin, owned by Axel Oberwelland. Its subsidiary in the United Kingdom has been the company Bendicks in Winchester since 1988. The main facility of Storck in Germany is in Halle, North Rhine-Westphalia, one is located in Skanderborg, Denmark, along with one in Ohrdruf, Germany.

History
The company was founded in 1903 by August Storck, who later became August Oberwelland.

Brands
These are the most well-known products and the corresponding year in which they launched:
 Bendicks
 Campino (1966)
 Château chocolate, produced for Aldi
 Chocolat Pavot (English: Chocolate Poppy) (2003)
 Kaufrüchtchen (English: Chewy Little Fruits)
 Knoppers (1983)
 Mamba
 Merci (1965)
 Merci Crocant (English: Crispy Thank You) (1994)
 Merci Petits (English: Little Thank Yous) (formerly Merci Pur)
 Milkfuls
 Minis zuckerfrei (English: Sugar-free Minis)
 Moser-Roth chocolate (1902), revived 2007 and produced exclusively for Aldi
 Nimm2 (English: Take2) (1962)
 Nimm2 Lachgummi (English: Take2 Laughing Chews) (1996)
 Nimm2 soft (2005)
 Riesen (English: Giants) (1930s; chocolate-covered version, late 1980s)
 Toffifee (known in the US as Toffifay) (1973)
 Werther's Original (1969)

See also
 List of bean-to-bar chocolate manufacturers

References

External links
 

Food manufacturers of Germany
Food and drink companies based in Berlin
Manufacturing companies based in Berlin
Food and drink companies established in 1903

German chocolate companies
German brands
German companies established in 1903